Jesse Bertram Kirkpatrick (October 2, 1897 – August 9, 1976) was an American film and television actor.

Life and career 
Kirkpatrick was born in Champaign County, Illinois. He attended the University of Illinois, where he played as a halfback in football in the 1920s. Kirkpatrick was named in Walter Eckersall's All-American team and in football coach Robert Zuppke’s all-time backfield. 

Kirkpatrick supported himself at University by playing as a jazz dummer in a student band. He was also a singer, appearing with Earl Burtnett’s orchestra in 1931, and as a singer and master of ceremonies with Harold Stokes on the WGN radio show Melodies from the Sky.

Kirkpatrick worked as an announcer for the radio broadcasting station WGN for ten years. Kirkpatrick moved to Hollywood, California, starting his screen career playing a broadcaster in the 1946 film My Dog Shep. He also played Patrick Riley in the 1949 film The Judge. Kirkpatrick played as a bartender for five episodes in the western television series Johnny Ringo.

Kirkpatrick appeared in films such as D.O.A., The Captive City, Sweethearts on Parade, Star in the Dust, The Private War of Major Benson, Alaska Passage, Police Dog Story, Outside the Law, Somebody Up There Likes Me, The Moonlighter, The Mob, Man of a Thousand Faces, Day of the Badman, Ten North Frederick and A Millionaire for Christy. 
He also guest-starred in numerous television programs including Gunsmoke, Bonanza, The Fugitive, The Life and Legend of Wyatt Earp, Petticoat Junction, Bachelor Father, Wagon Train, Perry Mason, Alfred Hitchcock Presents, McHale's Navy, The Real McCoys, Leave It to Beaver, Tales of Wells Fargo, Death Valley Days, 77 Sunset Strip, Man with a Camera and The Beverly Hillbillies. His final credit was in the television series Mayberry R.F.D. in 1969.

Death 
Kirkpatrick died in August 1976 of a heart attack while playing handball with three doctors in La Jolla, California, at the age of 78.

References

External links 

Rotten Tomatoes profile

1897 births
1976 deaths
People from Champaign County, Illinois
Male actors from Illinois
American male film actors
American male television actors
20th-century American male actors
Western (genre) television actors
American male singers
20th-century American singers
20th-century American male singers
Players of American football from Illinois
American jazz drummers
American radio personalities
American football halfbacks
University of Illinois Urbana-Champaign alumni